The 2018 NCAA Division I women's soccer tournament (also known as the 2018 Women's College Cup) was the 37th annual single-elimination tournament to determine the national champion of NCAA Division I women's collegiate soccer. The semifinals and championship game were played at WakeMed Soccer Park in Cary, North Carolina from November 30 – December 2, 2018 while the preceding rounds were played at various sites across the country during November 2018.

Qualification

All Division I women's soccer programs were eligible to qualify for the tournament. 28 teams received automatic bids by winning their conference tournaments, 3 teams received automatic bids by claiming the conference regular season crown (Ivy League, Pac-12 Conference, and West Coast Conference don't hold conference tournaments), and an additional 33 teams earned at-large bids based on their regular season records.

Stanford Bracket

Georgetown Bracket

North Carolina Bracket

Florida State Bracket

Bracket
The bracket was announced on Monday, November 5, 2018

Stanford Section

* Host institution

Schedule

First round

Second round

Round of 16

Quarterfinals 

Rankings from United Soccer Coaches Final Regular Season Rankings

Georgetown Section

* Host institution

Schedule

First round

Second round

Round of 16

Quarterfinals 

Rankings from United Soccer Coaches Final Regular Season Rankings

North Carolina Section

* Host institution

Schedule

First round

Second round

Round of 16

Quarterfinals 

Rankings from United Soccer Coaches Final Regular Season Rankings

Florida State Section

* Host institution

Schedule

First round

Second round

Round of 16

Quarterfinals 

Rankings from United Soccer Coaches Final Regular Season Rankings

College Cup

Schedule

Semi-finals

Final 

Rankings from United Soccer Coaches Final Regular Season Rankings

Record by conference 

The R32, S16, E8, F4, CG, and NC columns indicate how many teams from each conference were in the Round of 32 (second round), Round of 16 (third round), Quarterfinals, Semi-finals, Final, and National Champion, respectively.
The following conferences received one bid and finished the tournament with a record of 0–1–0: America East, Atlantic 10, Big Sky, Big West, C-USA, Horizon, Ivy, MAAC, Mid-American, MVC, Mountain West, Northeast, OVC, Patriot, Southern, Southland, SWAC, Summit, Sun Belt, WAC.  In the interest of conserving space, these teams are not shown in the table.

Statistics

Goalscorers

All-Tournament team

See also 
 NCAA Women's Soccer Championships (Division II, Division III)
 NCAA Men's Soccer Championships (Division I, Division II, Division III)
 2018 NCAA Division I men's soccer tournament

References

NCAA
NCAA Women's Soccer Championship
2018 NCAA Division I women's soccer season
NCAA Division I Women's Soccer Tournament
NCAA Division I Women's Soccer Tournament
NCAA Division I Women's Soccer Tournament